Salelavalu may refer to:

 Salelavalu Tai, village in Samoa
 Salelavalu Uta, village in Samoa